The University of the Philippines Diliman, also referred to as UPD, UP Diliman, or simply University of the Philippines or UP, is a public, coeducational, research university located in Diliman, Quezon City, Philippines. It was established on February 12, 1949, as the flagship campus and seat of administration of the University of the Philippines System, the national university of the Philippines.

As a member of the University of the Philippines System, it is the fourth oldest and is the largest constituent campus in terms of the number of degree-granting academic units, student population, faculty, and library resources. There are 27 degree-granting units on campus, accounting for 22,031 students of which, 15,299 are undergraduates. UP Diliman had a complement of 1,526 full-time faculty in 2012, of whom 528 have doctoral degrees.

In addition to the units in the main campus, UP Diliman has extension programs in Angeles City, Pampanga (the Clark Freeport Zone area) and Olongapo, Zambales, as well as a marine laboratory in Bolinao, Pangasinan under the Marine Science Institute, and an annex campus at Bonifacio Global City, Taguig. UP Diliman offers academic programs in 247 major fields.  There are 70 programs at the undergraduate level, 109 at the master's level and 68 at the doctoral level.

The UP Diliman campus is also the site of the country's National Science Complex. Notable research units of UP Diliman centered at the National Science Complex include the Marine Science Institute (MSI), the National Institute of Geological Sciences (NIGS), the National Institute of Physics (NIP), the National Institute of Molecular Biology and Biotechnology–Diliman (NIMBB-Diliman), and the National Institute for Science and Mathematics Education Development (NISMED), which are all pioneers of scientific research and development in the Philippines. The Sentro ng Wikang Filipino, devoted to research on the intellectualization of the Filipino language is also located in the campus.

History

While the present campus of UP Diliman was opened in 1949, it traces its institutional history from the different humanities, liberal arts, and engineering departments that were originally based in what is now the University of the Philippines Manila. The population of students at the University of the Philippines continued to rise in succeeding years, reaching 7,849 in 1928 from the initial 67 when the university was established in 1908. The need became apparent for UP to create more buildings and academic units, which would have been hampered by its small location in the heart of Manila. In 1939, the Board of Regents acquired a 493-hectare land in the Diliman District of the newly established Quezon City. Construction began on the area in the same year. The development of the area was then stalled by World War II, with invading Japanese troops occupying some of the buildings built. By 1942, the university was forced to close down some of its colleges, with only the Colleges of Medicine, Engineering, and Pharmacy maintaining their operations.

When the war ended in 1945, the buildings intended to be the homes of the College of Law and the College of Liberal Arts were left with extensive damages. The university administration led by UP President Bienvenido Gonzales sought a grant worth P13 million from the US-Philippines War Damage Commission to restore the damaged facilities and to construct new ones so that the transfer of the university from Manila to Diliman could be pushed through. Through a symbolic ceremony of transferring the Oblation from Manila to Diliman, the whole university's administration was relocated to the new campus. New buildings were constructed in response to the creation of more academic degrees.

Organization of the newly established institutes and the reformulation of programs followed with the establishment of programs such as the General Education Program, a delegated roster of core courses required to be taken by all students at the undergraduate level. Under the presidency of UP President Vicente Sinco, a University College was made to address the need for a much-organized college structure. The College of Arts and Sciences was created to offer major subjects in the natural sciences, social sciences, and humanities.

By the end of Carlos P. Romulo's term as UP President in 1968, UP had also become not only an institution of education but also a center of research, a veritable think tank, while many of its faculty served as advisers and consultants in the national government. Romulo's administration was marked by the establishment of the Population Institute, the Law Center and the Applied Geodesy and Photogrammetry Training Center in 1964, the Institute of Mass Communication (now College of Mass Communication), the College of Business Administration (now UP Virata School of Business), and the Institute of Planning in 1965, the UP Computer Center, the Institute for Small-Scale Industries in 1966, the Institute of Social Work and Community Development in 1967 and the Asian Center in 1968.

UP Diliman became the bastion of activism in the 1960s and 1970s, with various tumultuous events eventually contributing to the declaration of Martial Law in 1972. In this period, UP Diliman became a center of dissent towards the Marcos' administration. The year 1971 marked an important event in the Philippine history when the entire Diliman campus was declared the Diliman Commune, and became free from government control. Students and faculty members took over the campus in response to increasing military presence and the increase of oil prices. The students established full control of the campus for a month, barricading the streets with chairs and tables.

The university sustained its priorities of pushing for advancement in education despite the political unrest during the 1970s. Under the leadership of UP President Salvador P. Lopez, UP Diliman was given part of the P150 million grant from the national budget to improve infrastructure.  It funded the construction of the buildings for the College of Business Administration, Zoology, the Institute of Small-Scale Industries, the Transport Training Center, and the Coral Laboratory of the Marine Sciences Institute.

The Management Review Committee (MRC) was created by UP President Edgardo Angara in the 1980s to evaluate and recommend measures for the university's improvement. The report made by the MRC led to the decision of the Board of Regents to further decentralize the UP administration, declaring UP Diliman an autonomous unit and the system's flagship university on March 23, 1983. This also furthered the reorganization of some major units of the university, with the College of Arts and Sciences being split into three colleges: the College of Science, the College of Arts and Letters and the College of Social Sciences and Philosophy. UP Diliman was formally established as a constituent university on April 23, 1985, at the 976th Meeting of the U.P. Board of Regents.

By the turn of the new millennium, UP Diliman led other universities with the installation of a fiber-optic network linking the different colleges on the campus. The Diliman Network, or DilNet, became the university's access point to the internet. Recently and with the help of the Quezon City government, the University of the Philippines entered into contracts with various entities to maximize the use of several leasable land assets in the UP Diliman campus. One example of which is the U.P.-Ayala Land TechnoHub.

A fire on campus killed 8 people and destroyed 80 homes on 2 May 2022.

Campus
Much of this property is utilized by the university in the form of infrastructure and research facilities, while the remaining area is forested, reserved for development and residential use, or unoccupied.

The main campus, the science and technology parks located on the eastern and western sides of the university, and the residential (Area 2) and Barangay U.P. Campus communities stretching from the western side to the northern tip of the university comprise the areas most actively used by U.P.D.

Infrastructure development has been ongoing on campus in the last three years as part of two major programs: the National Science Complex (NSC) and the Engineering Research and Development Technology (ERDT) Consortium. 

In a bid to boost initiatives in the sciences and technology, former Philippine President Gloria Macapagal Arroyo established the NSC through Executive Order 583 on December 8, 2006, to be administered and operated by the College of Science. Some ₱2 billion was allocated to the program to increase research and technological capacity in the country. Of that amount, ₱1.7 billion was earmarked for the construction of the NSC; in particular, the completion of the buildings for the National Institute of Physics and the Institute of Mathematics. It also funded the construction of buildings for the Institute of Chemistry, the Institute of Biology, the National Institute of Molecular Biology and Biotechnology, the Institute of Environmental Science and Meteorology, and the College of Science Administration buildings.

The ERDT, on the other hand, is a 10-year program that seeks, among others, to attain “a critical mass of MS and Ph.D. graduates in engineering; upgrade the qualifications of practicing engineers; provide accessible graduate education; upgrade engineering colleges, and develop a culture of research & development.”

The ERDT is implemented by a consortium of seven universities in the country offering Masters and Doctoral degrees in the various engineering fields. As part of the program, funds have enabled the construction of the following buildings for the units under the U.P.D. College of Engineering, namely: Chemical Engineering, Electrical, and Electronics Engineering Institute, Institute of Civil Engineering; Mining, Metallurgical and Materials Engineering, Industrial Engineer/Mechanical Engineering, and Energy and Environmental Engineering.

The Oblation and Academic Oval

The U.P. Diliman campus is connected to Commonwealth Avenue via University Avenue. It stretches  where traffic enters the campus or proceeds towards C.P. Garcia St., which connects Commonwealth Avenue to Katipunan Avenue. At the end of University Avenue, the Oblation Plaza of the Diliman campus faces the road. Behind it, the facade of Quezon Hall can be seen.

The Oblation statue is the most iconic figure of the U.P. System. The statue was originally created by National Artist Guillermo E. Tolentino in 1935 in a collective effort by the students of the U.P. System. During the 40th anniversary of the University of the Philippines in 1949, the Oblation was transferred to Diliman in Quezon City from their original site along Padre Faura St. in Manila as a symbol of transfer of administrative seat. The Oblation was originally naked and made of concrete and stands  in height. For morality and censorship purposes, U.P. President Jorge Bocobo suggested to put a fig leaf to cover the genitals. In 1950, the Board of Regents ordered the statue to be cast in true bronze. Tolentino made a trip to Italy to personally supervise the casting of his old masterpiece into bronze.  The bronze statue, unveiled on November 29, 1958, is now housed at Gonzalez Hall where the University Library is also located.

Several replicas of Tolentino's Oblation statue were created during the creation of new U.P. campuses, some were made by the National Artist Napoleon Abueva. U.P. Diliman's Oblation statue located in the Oblation Plaza is also a concrete-made replica of Tolentino's. 

The main and largest road in the university is the Academic Oval, informally known as "Acad Oval." This road is composed of two joining avenues, the Roxas and Osmeña Avenues. The avenue derives its name from several colleges located around it, namely the College of Mass Communication, College of Music, College of Engineering, College of Law, School of Economics, College of Business Administration, College of Education, College of Social Sciences and Philosophy and School of Library and Information Studies. The oval also covers Quezon Hall, the U.P. Theater, National Engineering Center, Student Activity Center/Vinzons Hall, Center for International Studies and Jorge B. Vargas Museum. Additionally, the Academic Oval is planted with over 500 acacia and fire trees.

The Alumni Walk was launched in U.P.’s centennial year in 2008. A project of the UPD administration under then-Chancellor Sergio S. Cao, the project sought to transform the inner sidewalk of the Academic Oval into a tile-paved footpath with commemorative slabs bearing UPD alumni-donors’ names, and whose donations went to the UPD Faculty Development Fund. In March 2008, however, the Academic Oval was turned into one-way in order to lessen traffic volume entering the university. According to then Vice Chancellor for Community Affairs Cynthia Grace Gregorio, the policy also promotes lessening air pollution by creating biking lanes on the inner side of the circle.

Quezon Hall

Quezon Hall is the seat of administration of both the UP System and UPD, was designed by Juan Nakpil, who has conferred the first National Artist for Architecture title in 1973. He was one of eight children of the Philippine Revolution veterans Julio Nakpil and Gregoria de Jesús (who married the former after the death of her first husband Andrés Bonifacio).

It is the front-most building of the university from University Avenue. It houses many of the administrative offices for the entire university. It is situated behind the Oblation statue as a gateway or entrance position, with four columns supporting the main hall itself. The building is classified as eclectic architecture. Eclectic Architecture can be described as using the elements of different historical styles and multiple theories in a single structure. It is a combination of a variety of influences.

Quezon Hall was among the buildings constructed at the Diliman campus in the early 1950s, following the university's exodus from Padre Faura to Diliman in 1949. An imposing colonial structure at the end of University Avenue, it was completed in 1950.

A marker from the National Historical Institute (NHI) is located on its front lawn along with the oblation statue.

Carillon and bell tower

The only carillon in the Philippines and in Southeast Asia that is manually played by a clavier or a wooden keyboard, the U.P. Carillon towers about 130 feet tall. The U.P. Carillon was originally constructed in 1940 by National Artist Juan Nakpil, Conservatory of Music director Ramon Tapales and UP President Bienvenido Gonzales with an initial idea of building a concrete structure that may tower the grounds of the university. Several years later, on August 1, 1952, the tower was finished and dedicated as the U.P. Carillon. Forty-eight bells with four octaves were installed by the Dutch carillonneur Adrian Antonisse, with the efforts laid by the U.P. Alumni Association. These bells were forged by Van Bergen Co. in Netherlands and the largest of them weighs five tons, where the total cost of construction summed up to ₱200,000.

Apart from playing the U.P.'s anthem UP Naming Mahal (U.P. Beloved), the carillon tuned many music such as the Magtanim ay Di Biro (Planting Rice, a Filipino folk song) and The Beatles sounds. One of the most important tunings of the carillon was when it played the socialist anthem The Internationale at the 1971 Diliman Commune. During this time, U.P. students declared the university as a republic and as a separate entity from the Philippines.

Due to age and rust, the carillon ceased to play in 1981. In 1988, the last symphonies of U.P. Naming Mahal and Push On U.P.! (U.P. Diliman's athletic cheer) from the tower was played during the December's Lantern Parade. Since then, the carillon was never tuned. But as late as 2001, students say that they can hear the rhymes of London Bridge Is Falling Down and Sing a Song of Six Pence despite being closed to prevent further mishap.

In 2005, through the collective efforts of the U.P. Alumni Association and various private donors, the U.P. Carillon Restoration Project of the U.P. Centennial Commission launched a fund-raising program to collect ₱20 million to restore the carillon, as a projection of using the tower again in the coming 100th year of the University of the Philippines. After two years, the Project was able to collect ₱14 million which will be used to clean up and repair the tower itself and to replace the bells.

In 2007, the carillon was formally reintroduced to the public after two years of restoration. The original 48 bells were put into archives and are now replaced by 36 bells bought from Dutch company Petit & Fritsen for ₱12 million whereas the construction engineers were provided by the Royal Bell Philippines. According to project engineer Matthew Bergers, each bell was made from 80% bronze and 20% combination of zinc, magnesium and phosphorus. At the same time, the largest of these bells weighs  and the smallest weighs . The original wood claviers were replaced by heavy-duty oakwood while all bells are designed to hold refurbished steel pipes. Another project engineer Eduardo Otacan also said that the new bells will have 3 octaves and they can be programmed using computers attached to the clavier.

At the same time, a small amphitheater named Carillon Plaza was constructed at the base of the tower. After about two decades of silence, the U.P. Carillon was heard again during the Lantern Parade of 2007.

Sunken Garden

The Gen. Antonio Luna Parade Grounds, or commonly known as the Sunken Garden, is a  natural depression found on the eastern side of the campus and at the end of the Academic Oval circle. Sunken Garden is enclosed by the UP Diliman Main Library, College of Social Sciences and Philosophy's Department of Psychology, College of Education, Student Activity Center/Vinzons Hall, College of Business Administration, School of Economics and College of Law. The Grounds was originally a property of the UP Reserved Officers' Training Corps when the campus was founded in 1949.

Gen. Antonio Luna Parade Grounds acquired its name Sunken Garden due to its basin-shaped low-level formation that has the deepest point of 65 meters above sea level (contrary to the university's height that is over hundreds of meters above sea level). The Sunken Garden is the venue of the annual U.P. Fair as well as for sports tournaments, including football, frisbee and volleyball. Sometimes, the Department of Military Science and Tactics hold training in the area.

According to local lore, the Sunken Garden sinks by about two inches every year. Though this has not been verified in any study, some have posited reasons for the sinking: one is that it is because of underground trenches over the campus' sewer system that connects to the Marikina Fault Line, an active geologic structure that runs across the east of Metro Manila. Another theory is that the depression was due to the emptying of former streams in the Sunken Garden that were prominent in the 1950s. These streams formerly run from Katipunan Avenue, going to the garden itself and leaves the campus for Commonwealth Avenue.

UP Promenade 

Inaugurated in 2018, the UP Promenade is a 120-meter walkway equipped with internet and Wi-Fi capable facilities available for the use of every student and faculty member of the Diliman campus.  Fronting Gonzales Hall (Main Library), it is a 7.5 meter wide (extending to 16 meters, more or less, at certain portions) by 120 meter broad walkway with alcoves, plazas and benches. It is a legacy project donated by Upsilon Sigma Phi as part of an external learning center within the campus . In the middle of UP Promenade is called the “Freedom Plaza".

Administration

U.P. Diliman is the fourth oldest and is the largest, in terms of student population, of all the seven major campuses of the University of the Philippines. The University of the Philippines is governed by the Board of Regents' 11 members, of whom five are ex officio, three are student, faculty, and staff representatives, and three are appointed by the President of the Philippines. Each campus of the University of the Philippines is headed by a chancellor. The first chancellor of U.P. Diliman was Senator Edgardo J. Angara, whose office was created on April 26, 1982. The chancellor is assisted by five vice chancellors — for academic affairs, administration, community affairs, research & development, and student affairs. The current chancellor is Dr. Fidel Nemenzo, who was appointed by the Board of Regents into position during its meeting on February 3, 2020.

Apart from heading the university, the chancellor also holds administrative duties that represent the Board of Regents at the campus level. The chancellor also serves as chairperson of the university council, an internal coordinating body composed of the chancellor himself, the university registrar who serves as secretary, and the professorial faculty. The vice chancellor for academic affairs, on the other hand, assists the chancellor in coordinating curricular, instructional, library, and other programs of the university. The vice chancellor for administration assists the chancellor in the administrative management of the campus. The vice-chancellor for community affairs assists the chancellor in promoting relationships within the university and in dealing with local government and safety issues, while the vice chancellor for research & development assists the chancellor in formulating guidelines and criteria for the university's research and development endeavors. Finally, the vice chancellor for student affairs assists the chancellor in promoting wellness and discipline among students in areas such as health, food services, and scholarship management.

Academics

Colleges and Institutes

The academic arms of the university are called colleges, institutes, or schools. A number of colleges and schools offer a variety of undergraduate, graduate, and diploma programs, while some offer programs only within a specific field. Most institutes offer no degrees whatsoever, but provide research facilities for academic development.

Each college or school is headed by a dean, who is appointed by the U.P. Board of Regents upon the recommendation of the chancellor and the president of the university. The dean acts as the head of the faculty of his college and assumes administrative duties assigned by the Board. The dean has a tenure of three years, which may be extended for up to two terms upon reappointment. The associate dean, on the other hand, assists the dean in the administration of the unit. The tenure of the associate dean is determined by the Board of Regents upon the recommendation of the chancellor and the dean.

Some of U.P. Diliman's academic arms assume the title of "Institute" (such as the Asian Institute of Tourism, and the Institute of Islamic Studies) and function as their own units, with their own departments. Some institutes are within colleges (such as the Institute of Civil Engineering within the College of Engineering). Some of U.P. Diliman's academic arms also assume the title of "School" (such as the School of Economics), which might function independently and have their own departments or which may operate as a unit within a particular college.

U.P. Diliman's institutes are headed by institute directors, who assume the duties assigned by the chancellor. Each director has a tenure of three years, which may be extended for up to two terms upon the reappointment of the chancellor. A director cannot be an academic head of any department or division under his institute. Each college or school is composed of clusters of institutes or departments.

The university's departments are headed by department chairs, who assume the duties assigned by the dean and the chancellor. Each chair is appointed by the chancellor, as recommended by the dean or institute director, and has a tenure of three years, which may be extended for up to two terms upon reappointment.

Some units of the university are known as National Institutes, such as the National Institute of Molecular Biology and Biotechnology. The status of being an institute is determined by the Board of Regents, but recognition as a national institute is governed by Philippine legislation. The head of a national institute, also the director, is not appointed by the chancellor but by the president of the university.

U.P. Diliman is composed of 26 colleges, schools, and institutes. Officially, these are called degree-granting units. The oldest of these colleges is the College of Fine Arts, established in 1908 and originally located in Manila. On the other hand, the first college to operate on the Diliman campus is the College of Music (then Conservatory of Music) in 1949.

Grading System and Academic Calendar
Academic performance is rated from 1.00 being excellent to 5.00 as failed. Grades from 1.00 to 3.00 are separated by increments of 0.25, while 3.00 is followed immediately by 4.00 and then 5.00. Some professors use 0.50 as increments instead, and some colleges, particularly the College of Engineering do not give 4.00 grades. A grade of four (4.00) is a conditional grade and a student needs to remove the grade of 4.00 during a prescribed period (usually determined by the college where he/she is enrolled) or else it will become 5.00 once the period has lapsed. A conditional grade can only be removed by a removal exam; if the student passes the exam, he/she will obtain a grade of 3.00; otherwise, it is 5.00. An alternative for 4.00 is the rating of "INC", which means incomplete, and is given to students who have unfinished requirements for a particular subject. If a student drops the subject before the "subject dropping period" his/her record for that subject will be replaced by "DRP".

Students who attain a grade point average of 1.20 or better, 1.45 to 1.20, and 1.75 to 1.45 are awarded upon graduation as summa cum laude, magna cum laude and cum laude respectively. Up until 2014, graduation occurred every April and October, with commencement exercises being held only in April. The shift in the academic calendar moved graduation dates to June and December, with commencement exercises being done only during the month of June. U.P. Diliman had an average of 3,190 undergraduates, 627 MS graduates, and 73 Ph.D. students graduating every year. The most number of honor graduates came from the College of Social Sciences and Philosophy, followed by the College of Business Administration, College of Engineering, College of Mass Communication and College of Architecture.

The academic year is divided into two semesters, each having at least 16 weeks, excluding the registration period. The first semester starts in August and ends in December, followed by the Christmas holidays. The second semester starts in January, with a semestral break during the Holy Week. There is a short mid-year term from June to July.

Rankings and Accreditation

Rankings and reputation

The consulting organization and publisher of global academic rankings Center for World University Rankings (CWUR) ranks U.P. Diliman as third among all Philippine universities and 1,758th worldwide.

As of 2018, U.P. Diliman has the most Centers of Excellence of all higher education institutions in the Philippines. The accreditation "Center of Excellence" is awarded by the Philippines' Commission on Higher Education (CHED) to "department[s] within higher education institution[s], which continuously demonstrate excellent performance in the areas of instruction, research and publication, extension and linkages and institutional qualifications."

As part of the University of the Philippines System, U.P. Diliman is also considered as an SUC and the only national university of the Philippines. The nature of the University of the Philippines puts it in a position where it does not need any accreditation by any other local body.

Culture, sports and traditions 

The Diliman community is sometimes referred to as the Diliman Republic and a "microcosm of the Philippines". It is the only university in Metro Manila that has its own jeepney transportation system due to its sheer size. The university also has a congressional franchise to operate two radio stations (AM and FM) as well as a television station. Currently, the university only operates DZUP 1602, a community AM radio station. The campus encompasses a number of residential areas and many students claim a sense of solidarity with the residents of these immediate communities. On the other hand, The Philippine Collegian is the official student publication of the university, and one of only three tertiary-level campus publications in the Philippines released weekly.

U.P. Diliman represents the U.P. System in the University Athletic Association of the Philippines (UAAP) and participates in all events. The Fighting Maroons have perennially placed in the top three in the overall points race of the UAAP. One of the most popular athletic teams in the program is the U.P. Pep Squad, a heavyweight in the annual UAAP Cheerdance Competition.

Two of the most-awaited events inside the campus are the Lantern Parade, held in the last week before the Christmas break, and the U.P. Fair, held every February. During the Lantern Parade, the individual colleges as well as groups within U.P.D. create Christmas lanterns and floats and parade around the Academic Oval, culminating in a lengthy program held in front of the Amphitheater capped off by a massive fireworks display. In recent years the event has become so popular even outside of UP that media outlets and major Manila television networks regularly send crews to broadcast the event live.

The U.P. Fair, organized by the UP Diliman University Student Council, is a week-long event held at the Sunken Garden that features evening music concerts, booths, and amusement park rides. Typically falling during the third week of February, students and youth even from outside the U.P. System flock to the nightly concerts.

Centennial Celebration

On January 8, 2008, the University of the Philippines System, with 7 constituent universities and 12 campuses offering 258 undergraduate and 438 graduate programs, began its centennial celebration at the Diliman campus. The university has produced 7 of 17 presidents, 12 chief justices of the Supreme Court, 34 of 35 national scientists and 36 of 57 national artists, and an estimated 250,000 alumni (15,000 doctors, 8,000 lawyers and 23,000 teachers). Of the senators serving in the 2010–2013 term, 14 were from UP.

Fernando Javier, 100, of Baguio, oldest living U.P. alumnus (Civil Engineering from the University of the Philippines Manila, 1933), began the 100-torch relay at the U.P. academic oval in Diliman, Quezon City. The 99th torchbearer was Michael Reuben Dumlao, youngest, a 6th-grader from the University of the Philippines Integrated School in U.P. Diliman. Then U.P. president Emerlinda R. Roman, also its first woman president, ignited the centennial cauldron in front of the U.P. Oblation plaza.

The cauldron featured three pillars representing the university's core values of Excellence, Leadership, and Service and 7 flowers representing the constituent universities, to wit, U.P. Manila, U.P. Diliman (together with U.P. Pampanga, its extension campus), U.P. Los Baños, U.P. Baguio, U.P. Visayas, U.P. Mindanao, and U.P. Open University.

The centennial celebration came with a massive fund-raising campaign for the U.P. System, and generous donations from alumni came pouring in. One of the largest was the GT-Toyota Asian Cultural (ACC) Center, a gleaming 100-million-peso, one-hectare complex envisioned to be a major hub of campus activity as well as the main site of the Asian Center's different collaborations.

UPAA 2008 Centennial Yearbook
The University of the Philippines Alumni Association announced its launching of a special three-volume U.P.A.A. 2008 Centennial Yearbook on June 21, 2008, at the U.P.A.A. Grand Alumni-Faculty Homecoming and Reunion at the Araneta Coliseum, Cubao, Quezon City. The theme was “U.P. Alumni: Excellence, Leadership, and Service in the Next 100 Years,” with the three cover designs showing the works of national artists Napoleon Abueva, Abdul Imao, and Benedicto Cabrera. Chief Justice Reynato Puno was the yearbook's most distinguished alumnus awardee (among 47 other awardees).

Notable alumni 

The University of the Philippines Diliman has numerous notable alumni and faculty. UP graduated many leading figures in the country. In the country's political history, UP has produced former Philippine presidents, José P. Laurel and Ferdinand E. Marcos; statesmen Benigno Aquino Jr.; Arturo Tolentino, Gerardo Roxas, and Doy Laurel; prominent jurists such as former chief justices Querube Makalintal, Enrique Fernando; incumbent Senators Francis Pangilinan and Richard J. Gordon; and incumbent Congressmen Martin Romualdez, Roman Romulo, and Jesus Crispin Remulla. In business, UP graduated billionaire and Araneta patriarch Jorge L. Araneta.

Student organizations 
The fraternities and sororities in UP Diliman are UP Delta Lambda Sigma sorority (which produced Senator Pia Cayetano), UP Portia sorority (which produced UP Law dean Fides Cordero-Tan and Chief Justices Maria Lourdes Sereno and Teresita de Castro), Alpha Phi Beta fraternity (which produced Chief Justice Reynato Puno and Governor Francis Escudero), and Sigma Rho fraternity (which produced Justice Antonio Carpio, Presidential Spokesperson Salvador Panelo, and Sonny Angara), Alpha Sigma fraternity (which produced UP Law dean and sitting Judge of the International Criminal Court Raul Pangalangan), Alpha Sigma Nu sorority, Alpha Phi Omega (which produced COMELEC Chair Haydee Yorac and Vice President Jejomar Binay), Pi Sigma fraternity (which produced Bases Conversion and Development Authority CEO Arnel Casanova), UP Vanguard fraternity (which produced Atty. Philip Sigfrid Fortun, the founding partner of the law firm Fortun, Narvasa and Salazar), Upsilon Sigma Phi (which produced President Ferdinand Marcos, President Jose P. Laurel, Vice President Doy Laurel, Vice President Arturo Tolentino, Senate President Gil Puyat, Senator Ninoy Aquino, Senator Richard Gordon, Senator Francis Pangilinan, Senator Joker Arroyo, Senator Gerardo Roxas, Senator Sotero Laurel, Senator Domocao Alonto, Senator Mamintal A.J. Tamano, Senator Estanislao Fernandez, Senator Juan Liwag, Chief Justice Querube Makalintal, Chief Justice Enrique Fernando, ten Associate Justices, ABS-CBN Vice President Jake Almeda Lopez, ABS founder (later part of a merger to form ABS-CBN) Antonio Quirino, and famous lawyer Estelito Mendoza), Pan Xenia fraternity (which produced Manny Villar), Beta Sigma, Tau Alpha, Scintilla Juris, and Tau Gamma Phi. Each of these groups can boast of prominent alumni of the college as among its members. To gain membership, candidates must undergo initiation rites to determine a candidate's emotional stability, physical endurance, and mental capacity.

See also 
 DZUP 1602
 Church of the Holy Sacrifice
 Jorge B. Vargas Museum and Filipiniana Research Center

Notes

References

External links

University of the Philippines system
University of the Philippines Diliman
GMA NEWS.TV, video, UP students join the festive launch of the centennial year, 01/08/2008

 
Educational institutions established in 1949
1949 establishments in the Philippines
Diliman
Research universities in the Philippines
Art schools in the Philippines
Film schools in the Philippines
University Athletic Association of the Philippines universities
State universities and colleges in Metro Manila
Universities and colleges in Quezon City